Haddabat is a Turkmen village in northern Aleppo Governorate, northwestern Syria. In the 2004 census, Haddabat had a population of 387.

References

Populated places in al-Bab District
Turkmen communities in Syria